The Mission Church is a historic Episcopal log church building on the eastern fork of the Chandalar River in Arctic Village, Alaska, inside the Arctic National Wildlife Refuge.  Known also as Old Missionary Church and as Old Log Church, it was built in 1917. It was one of numerous mission churches established in Alaska by the Episcopal Church in the early 20th century.

The building is significant as a mission church and for association with Reverend Albert E. Tritt. He returned with a Takudh-language Bible and sought to bring others into the Episcopal church. He became a deacon of the Episcopal Church in 1925. He helped with the building of a newer church in the village in 1939.

The church was added to the National Register of Historic Places in 1977.

See also
National Register of Historic Places listings in Yukon–Koyukuk Census Area, Alaska

References

Churches completed in 1917
Episcopal church buildings in Alaska
Churches on the National Register of Historic Places in Alaska
Buildings and structures on the National Register of Historic Places in Yukon–Koyukuk Census Area, Alaska
Log buildings and structures on the National Register of Historic Places in Alaska
Wooden churches in the United States